Springfield Central High School (SCHS) is a public high school located in Springfield, Massachusetts, United States. The high school is for students in grades 9–12. With an enrollment of more than 2,000 students, Springfield Central High School describes itself as the largest high school in western Massachusetts.

History
Springfield Central High School opened in 1986. In 1986 two existing High schools merged campuses- Classical High and Technical High becoming the current campus of Springfield Central High School opened on September 3, 1986.
 
In 2008, the Springfield Public Schools created a mandatory district-wide uniform policy.

In 2010, Springfield Central retired jersey number 3 previously worn by basketball player Travis Best, who was a Parade magazine All-American and later played professionally in the NBA and internationally from 1995 to 2009.

Arts

Springfield Central partners with Shakespeare & Company (Massachusetts) every year, participating in the annual Fall Festival of Shakespeare, which brings more than 500 high school students together each year for a nine-week, collaborative, non-competitive, celebratory exploration and production of multiple Shakespeare plays.

Sports

Fall
Soccer
Volleyball (Girls)
Football (Boys)
Golf (Boys)
Cross Country
Cheer
Winter
Basketball
Swimming
Indoor Track
Wrestling
Cheer
Spring
Baseball (Boys)
Softball (Girls)
Tennis 
Track and Field
Volleyball (Boys)
Lacrosse (Boys)
Lacrosse (Girls)
Central also is home to the MA-O11 Air Force Junior Reserve Officer Training Corps (AFJROTC)wing.

Sports accomplishments 
The 2012 boys basketball team won the state championship and the football team won the 2012 Western Mass Super Bowl.

The Central Football team won the Division III State Championship for two consecutive years, 2018 and 2019.

The Air Force JROTC won the 2021 National Invitational Drill Competition, which was done virtually due to the COVID-19 pandemic.

The Central Football team won its first Division I State Championship in 2021.

References

High schools in Springfield, Massachusetts
Public high schools in Massachusetts
Educational institutions established in 1898
1898 establishments in Massachusetts
Hartwell and Richardson buildings